The Santa Fe Indian Market is an annual art market held in Santa Fe, New Mexico on the weekend following the third Thursday in August. The event draws an estimated 150,000 people to the city from around the world. The Southwestern Association for Indian Arts (SWAIA) organizes the market, showcasing work from 1,200 of the top Native American artists from tribes across the country.

History

Early Years 
Indian Market was organized by Kenneth M. Chapman in 1922 as part of an expanded Fiesta de Santa Fe sponsored by the Museum of New Mexico. Edgar L. Hewett, the museum's director, viewed the early Indian Fair events as part of his efforts for public anthropology. The events were held inside the National Guard Armory with an admission fee charged. Pueblo pottery, Navajo textiles, and Pueblo easel-style paintings, such as produced by Dorothy Dunn's Studio students at the Santa Fe Indian School,  were the primary art forms represented. Museum staff served as judges, screening work and awarding prizes. Potters themselves were not present for the sale of their works.  These early markets were intended to counteract museum and anthropological professionals concerns that tourist curio market's demand for pottery was reducing the quality and authenticity of Pueblo pottery.  In 1936, the New Mexico Association on Indian Affairs took over the event.  Between 1933-36, events were held at multiple pueblos, rather than in Santa Fe. Maria Chabot returned events to Santa Fe and the NMAIA organized transportation for artists and attached "labels of approval" to the works they believed represented the best works. Today, the Southwestern Association for Indian Arts organizes the market.

Response to COVID-19 Pandemic 
During the COVID-19 pandemic, the market went virtual for the month of August 2020, under the guidance of Executive Director Kimberly Peone (Colville Confederated Tribes/Eastern Band of Cherokee). The market took place in a hybrid format in 2021, with in-person and virtual events. Only 600 artists were accepted for in-person booths. The remaining 500 artists juried into the market waitlisted and offered opportunities to participate virtually. For the first time, in-person attendance was ticketed rather than free. Santa Fe Indian Market returned to fully in-person operation in August 2022.

SWAIA Native Leadership 
Prior to 2012, SWAIA's top leadership positions were non-Native.

John Torres Nez (Diné) 2012-2014

Dallin Maybee (Northern Arapaho-Seneca) 2014-18

Ira Wilson (Diné) 2018-19

Kim Peone (Colville Confederated Tribes/Eastern Band of Cherokee) 2020 - current

Featured art 
The market features pottery, jewelry, textile weavings, painting, sculpture, beadwork, basketry, and other traditional and contemporary work. It is the oldest and largest juried Native American art showcase in the world. The economic impact of the Market has been calculated at more than $19 million.

Beginning in 2014, the annual market began including a haute couture runway fashion show event in its programming. The event has grown annually. The 2022 program included two runway shows at the Santa Fe Convention Center with more than 1000 spectators each night. The shows featured celebrity runway models: Amber Midthunder, Zahn McClarnon, Jessica Matten, Kiowa Gordon, Eugene Brave Rock and D'Pharoh Woon-A-Tai. The founding director of SWAIA's Indigenous Fashion Show is curator and art historian Amber-Dawn Bear Robe (Siksika Nation.)

Authenticity standards for featured artists 
Artists display their work in booths around the Santa Fe Plaza and adjacent streets, selling directly to the general public. In order to participate, all artists must provide proof of enrollment in one of the federally recognized tribes, and their work must meet strict quality and authentic materials standards. Art experts judge the work and distribute awards and prize money in various categories.

Awards and Prizes 
On the evening before the Market's opening, members of SWAIA may attend a preview of representative works by the artists as well as the winners in each category. It is a way for potential buyers to preview the winning artworks and items for sale. Many buyers make a point of arriving downtown very early in the morning, and it is not unusual to find artists having sold out within a few hours.

See also
 Native American art
 List of Native American artists

References

External links
Southwestern Association for Indian Arts official website

Culture of Santa Fe, New Mexico
Native American history of New Mexico
Native American topics
Native American art
Native American arts organizations
Native Americans in Santa Fe, New Mexico
Tourist attractions in Santa Fe, New Mexico
Recurring events established in 1922
Art in New Mexico
Indigenous fashion designers of the Americas
Indigenous art of the Americas